Benjamin Van Hove (born 17 January 1981) is a Belgian field hockey player.  At the 2012 Summer Olympics, he competed for the national team in the men's tournament.

References

External links
 
 

Living people
Belgian male field hockey players
Field hockey players at the 2012 Summer Olympics
Olympic field hockey players of Belgium
1981 births